Veratalpa lugdunensiana is a fossil mammal from the Miocene of France. Known from a single astragalus (a footbone), the species was assigned to its own genus, Veratalpa, by Florentino Ameghino in 1905. He placed it in Talpidae, the family of the moles, but in 1974, John Howard Hutchison argued that the astragalus was not talpid and more likely came from a rodent. The astragalus is about 4.5 mm long, broad for a talpid, and has the head oriented farther from the axis of the foot than in talpids.

Taxonomy
Argentine naturalist Florentino Ameghino described Veratalpa in an overview of the astragali from the middle Miocene of Vieux Collonges in France. The astragalus is a bone of the foot that is part of the ankle joint. He listed several species of the family Talpidae (moles and related species) from Vieux Collonges, including "espèce C" ("species C"), which he named as a new genus and species, Veratalpa lugdunensiana, in a footnote. In a 1906 review of Ameghino's paper, Édouard Louis Trouessart affirmed that Veratalpa probably represented a new genus of mole, but noted that the specific name lugdunensiana would have been more correctly written "lugdunensis". According to Trouessart, the suffix -ana is appropriate for names that reference persons, but not for those that refer to places, such as this name, which is derived from Lugdunum (the Latin name for Lyon).

In a 1974 review of Miocene European talpids, John Howard Hutchison wrote that the astragalus of Veratalpa lacked any features that would ally it with talpids and commented that it was most likely a rodent. In their 1997 Classification of Mammals, Malcolm McKenna and Susan Bell listed Veratalpa as a member of Placentalia of uncertain affinities.

Description
The astragalus of Veratalpa is the largest among those from Vieux Collonges that Ameghino assigned to Talpidae. Although at 4.5 mm it is about as long as his "species A", it is broader, and Hutchison noted the broadness as one of the characters that argue against classification of Veratalpa in Talpidae. Like living moles, it has a broad, flat, and short head, but it forms a noticeably small angle with the body—in actual moles, the head is more axially oriented (i.e., towards the central axis of the foot). The surface of the head that contacts the navicula is less rounded than in moles. The body is low and nearly square and has a diameter of about 3 mm. The trochlea—a surface on the body of the bone that articulates with the tibia (lower leg bone)—is not large and pulley-like, as in talpids. There is a small perforation on the lower side of the body. This perforation is larger in Ameghino's other supposed talpids, and Trouessart suggested on the basis of this feature that the internal parts of the toes were reduced in Veratalpa.

Distribution
Veratalpa is known only from the locality of Vieux Collonges near Lyon in southeastern France; Ameghino knew this locality as "Mont-Ceindre". This rich fissure filling locality has yielded thousands of fossils and is currently dated to the early-middle Miocene boundary, around 17 million years ago (MN 4/5 in the MN zonation). As Veratalpa is known from a single astragalus, Ameghino considered it to be rare. He distinguished six talpid species among the astragali, but according to Hutchison only Ameghino's species F (which was assigned to Talpidae with a query) is really a talpid.

References

Literature cited
Ameghino, F. 1905. La perforation astragalienne sur quelques mammifères du Miocène moyen de France. Anales del Museo Nacional de Buenos Aires, series 3, 8:41–58.
Hutchison, J.H. 1974. Notes on type specimens of European Miocene Talpidae and a tentative classification of old world Tertiary Talpidae (Insectivora: Mammalia) (subscription required). Geobios 7(3):211–256.
Ivanov M. 2000. Snakes of the lower/middle Miocene transition at Vieux Collonges (Rhône, France), with comments on the colonisation of western Europe by colubroids. Geodiversitas 22(4):559–588.
McKenna, M.C. and Bell, S.K. 1997. Classification of Mammals: Above the species level. New York: Columbia University Press, 631 pp. 
Mein, P. and Freudenthal, M. 1981. Les Cricetidae (Mammalia, Rodentia) du Néogène Moyen de Vieux-Collonges. Partie 2: Cricetodontinae incertae sedis, Melissiodontinae, Platacanthomyinae, et Anomalomyinae. Scripta Geologica 60:1–11.
Trouessart, E. 1906. Mammiféres. Revue critique de paléozoologie 1:8–17.

Miocene mammals of Europe
Fossil taxa described in 1905